A yaw damper is a transverse mounted shock absorber used to prevent railcars and locomotives from swaying excessively from side to side. Yaw dampers prevent locomotives and passenger railcars from striking station platforms as they roll past them and reduce the gap that must be left between the railroad vehicle and the platform, improving safety.

References

External links
Railroad Yaw Damper Field Manual

Rail technologies